Jayanta Dey (born 29 February 1964)is a novelist and short story writer in Bengali living in Kolkata, West Bengal, India. He is also the editor of Saptahik Bartaman Magazine and works at daily  Bartaman Patrika. He has received awards like Somenchanda Smriti Puroskar, Golpomala Puroskar, Namita Chattopadhyay Sahitya Puroskar.

Early writing 
Jayanta Dey started writing poetry and was involved in publishing little magazine Amuk. He shifted to writing short stories after the 92-93 riots in India following the Demolition of the Babri Masjid  when he felt that he can't communicate himself in poetry. His short story Pendulum, using the symbolism of an antique clock to establish the communal hatred in urban Indian psyche was published in Teebro Kuthar magazine. The short story received wide acclaim and received attention from eminent Bengali novelist Debesh Ray. Jayanta Dey's short stories started to feature in several reputed Bengali literary magazines like Desh and Pratikhon.

Style
Jayanta Dey is a powerful writer. Noted critic Nityapriya Ghosh argues that his style is flawless. His novels deals a wide range of ideas dealing with transgender people, ragging, power and corruption, Kumbha Mela etc. He abhors violence and wants to supplement issues of revenge with fantasy and magic.

Works

Short story collections

Novels

References 

Living people
Bengali writers
1964 births